William James 'Bobby' Delahay (2 September 1900 – 12 September 1978) was a Welsh international rugby union who played club rugby for Bridgend and Cardiff. Although he played at scrum-half he was also selected for Wales at centre and fly-half.

Rugby career
Delahay first came to prominence as part of Bridgend Rugby Football Club, and played his first eight games for Wales while with the club. Delahay switched to first-class club Cardiff in 1923, and after leaving Cardiff, turned out as a veteran for Torquay Athletic and Devon. In 1924 Delahay was part of the Cardiff team to face the touring All Blacks, and although Cardiff lost 8-16, he scored a memorable try.  Delahay captained Cardiff during the 1926/27 season.

International rugby career
Delahay was first capped for Wales on the 21 January 1922 in a match against England. Delahay was one of eight new caps on the day and Wales beat England easily, scoring eight tries, Delahay scoring one of them. Delahay would be selected for all four games in the 1922 Five Nations Championship, which Wales won, but the next year, again selected for all four games in the competition Delahay was part of the Wales team that came last. In 1923, after his switch to Cardiff, Delahay gave some terrible performances in Welsh trials, and was not selected for the 1924 tournament. After his good game for Cardiff against the All Blacks, he was re-selected to play for Wales against the same touring New Zealanders.

Delahay would play all games in the 1925 and 1926 Five Nations Championships, and in the final game of the 1926 tournament he was selected as Wales captain in the game against France.

International matches played for Wales
  1922, 1923, 1925, 1926
  1922, 1923, 1925, 1926
  1922, 1923, 1925, 1926
  1924
  1922, 1923, 1925, 1926, 1927

Bibliography

References

1900 births
1978 deaths
Bridgend RFC players
Cardiff RFC players
Rugby union players from Bridgend
Rugby union scrum-halves
Wales international rugby union players
Wales rugby union captains
Welsh rugby union players